Holland of Warwick was an English stained glass manufacturing firm based in Warwick, Warwickshire and active throughout the mid-nineteenth-century. Like many Victorian stained glass producers of the time, the firm primarily produced ecclesiastical commissions.

Works
1853 East Window of All Souls’ Church, Crockenhill, Kent (1851).

References

Companies based in Warwick
Manufacturing companies of England
British stained glass artists and manufacturers